Zee Learn Limited provides education across India through its various ventures. The company operates through various schools and vocational educational institutions in India. It is listed on both the major stock exchanges in India.

Network 
School Networks:

 Mount Litera Zee Schools
 Kidzee Pre-Schools
 Mount Litera School International
 Mount Litera World Preschool

Youth Vocational Education:

 Zee Institute of Creative Arts (ZICA)
 Zee Institute of Media Arts (ZIMA)

See also 

 Essel Group
 Zee Entertainment Enterprises

References

Hindi-language television stations
Television channels and stations established in 2016
2016 establishments in Maharashtra
Zee Entertainment Enterprises